"Tie Your Mother Down" is a song by the British rock band Queen, written by lead guitarist Brian May. It is the opening track and the second single from their 1976 album A Day at the Races. On its original release as a single in 1977 the song peaked at 31 in the UK Singles Chart. More than 20 years later, it was released as a double a-side to "No-One but You (Only the Good Die Young)" where it reached 13 in UK Singles Chart. On the album the song is preceded by a one-minute instrumental intro featuring a Shepard tone melody, performed by Brian May, which is reprised in the ending of "Teo Torriatte": this was intended to create a "circle" within the album.

After its release in 1976, it was played by Queen on every subsequent tour. At the 1992 The Freddie Mercury Tribute Concert, the song was co-performed by Queen and guests Joe Elliott and Slash. On several occasions in recent years, Brian May and Roger Taylor have played the song live with the Foo Fighters, including performances at Queen's Rock and Roll Hall of Fame induction ceremony in 2001, and the VH1 Rock Honors in 2006.

History
Brian May started writing the song in Tenerife, while he was working for his PhD as an astrophysicist. He composed the riff on a Spanish guitar, and woke up one morning and played it while singing "tie your mother down," a line he considered a joke. Vocalist Freddie Mercury encouraged him to keep the line. "Tie Your Mother Down" opens with an ultra-heavy, stripped down guitar riff.

A promotional film was made for the song, directed by Bruce Gowers, based on a performance clip shot at Nassau Coliseum in Long Island, New York in February 1977 during the band's US arena headlining tour.

Though it was a long-time live favourite and a US FM rock radio favourite, the song had limited chart success, making #31 in the UK and #49 in the US. Therefore, it was included on the band's first Greatest Hits compilation in certain markets only; however, the song is featured on the Queen Rocks compilation album, together with some of the band's heaviest songs.

In a BBC Radio 4 tribute program to Rory Gallagher, May stated that a key inspiration for the riff of this song came from Taste's "Morning Sun" from their On the Boards (1970) album.

Queen comments on the song

Reception
Cash Box said that it "explodes with thunder bolts of electric guitar that few other groups can equal."  Record World called it "a no holds barred rocker" in which "the harmonies remain ever present."

Charts

Personnel
Freddie Mercury – lead and backing vocals
Brian May – electric guitar, backing vocals, harmonium (album version only)
Roger Taylor – drums, gong, backing vocals
John Deacon – bass guitar, backing vocals

Live performances
After its release in 1976, "Tie Your Mother Down" would go on to become the most frequent opening number for the remainder of the band's long career. At the 1992 Freddie Mercury Tribute Concert, the song was co-performed by Queen and guests; Def Leppard lead singer Joe Elliott and Guns N' Roses guitarist Slash. May sang the first verse and chorus before handing over the vocal part to Elliot. On several occasions in the recent years, May and Taylor have played this song live with the Foo Fighters, including performances at Queen's Rock and Roll Hall of Fame induction ceremony in 2001, VH1 Rock Honors 2006, and in Foo Fighters London Hyde Park concert for the encore of the show. On 5 September 2011, Jeff Beck performed the song with May and Taylor in celebration of what would have been Freddie Mercury's 65th birthday at an event titled 'Freddie for a Day' held at the Savoy Hotel in London.

Live recordings
Live Killers (1979)
We Will Rock You/Queen Rock Montreal (1981)
Queen on Fire - Live at the Bowl (1982)
Live at Wembley '86/Live at Wembley Stadium (1986)
Live Magic (1986)
Seville Expo 92 Concert (1992)
The Freddie Mercury Tribute Concert (1992)
Live at the Brixton Academy (Brian May album) (1993)
Return of the Champions (2005)
Super Live in Japan (2005)
Skin and Bones (Foo Fighters album/DVD, on the Hyde Park DVD) (2006)
Live in Ukraine (2008)

References

External links
Official YouTube videos: original music video, Live at Wembley, Live at the Bowl, at Rock Montreal, Queen + Paul Rodgers (live), at Freddie Mercury Tribute Concert (with Joe Elliot and Slash)
Lyrics at Queen official website

Queen (band) songs
1976 songs
1977 singles
Songs written by Brian May
Music videos directed by Bruce Gowers
EMI Records singles
Elektra Records singles
Hollywood Records singles
British hard rock songs